Saint-Barthélemy is a commune in the Morbihan department of Brittany in north-western France. Inhabitants of Saint-Barthélemy are called in French Bartholoméens.

See also
Communes of the Morbihan department

References

External links

Cultural heritage 

 Mayors of Morbihan Association 

Saintbarthelemy